Luigi Agnesi (17 July 1833 – 2 February 1875) was a Belgian operatic bass-baritone, conductor and composer.

Life and career
Born Louis Ferdinand Leopold Agniez in Namur, Agnesi graduated from the Royal Conservatory of Brussels in 1853. There he had studied with Charles-Marie-François Bosselet (harmony) and the François-Joseph Fétis (music composition). Shortly after graduating, he won the Belgian Prix de Rome which enabled him to pursue further studies in Italy for two years. His only opera composition, Hermold le Normand, premiered unsuccessfully at La Monnaie in 1858.

Frusturated with his composition career, Agniez decided to reorient himself towards a singing career. In 1861 he entered the Paris Conservatoire where he studied singing for the next three years under Gilbert Duprez. He made his professional opera debut in 1864 as Assur in Gioachino Rossini's Semiramide at the Théâtre-Italien in Paris. In 1865 he made his London debut at Her Majesty's Theatre, and thereafter his career was mainly centered in that city. He was highly active at the Royal Opera House and the Theatre Royal, Drury Lane up until his death in 1875 at the age of 41. He was particularly admired in England as King Henry VIII in Gaetano Donizetti's Anna Bolena and Alfonso in Donizetti's Lucrezia Borgia.

References

1833 births
1875 deaths
Conservatoire de Paris alumni
Belgian classical composers
Belgian opera composers
Male opera composers
Operatic bass-baritones
People from Namur (city)
Prix de Rome (Belgium) winners
19th-century classical composers
Belgian male classical composers
19th-century Belgian male opera singers